Canon is a retrospective album by Ani DiFranco which was released on September 11, 2007. It contains songs covering her career to date. DiFranco re-recorded five songs that had been previously released: "Both Hands", "Overlap", "Napoleon", "Shameless" and "Your Next Bold Move".

The album spans from DiFranco's first studio album, Ani DiFranco, released in 1990, to her then most recent, Reprieve, which was released in 2006. DiFranco personally selected the songs that appear on Canon.

Track listing 
All songs written by Ani DiFranco.

There is a misprint on the package. The numbers 10 and 11 are transposed in the track list on the back, though the titles are in the correct sequence.
Canon One

Canon Two

Personnel 

Ani DiFranco – acoustic, acoustic baritone, steel, electric, tenor, & bass guitars; piano; thumb piano; percussion; shakers, sounds; wurlitzer; vibes; vocals (throughout)

Canon One

Andy Stochanksy – drums (4, 6, 7, 8, 9, 11, 12, 13, 14, 15); percussion (8, 13); vocals (11, 12)
Sara Lee – bass (11, 12, 16); vocals (12)
Jason Mercer – bass (14, 15)
Todd Sickafoose – bass (17)
Mike Dillon – vibraphone (17)
Allison Miller – drums (17)
Jerry Marotta – drums (16)
Rory McLeod – harmonica (2)
Alisdair Jones – bass (4)
Michael Ramos – hammond organ (9)
John Mills – baritone sax (14)
Gary Slechta – trumpet (14)
Jon Blondell – trombone (14)
Joseph Arthur – background vocals (17)
Greg Dulli – wurlitzer (17)

Canon Two
Jason Mercer – bass (5, 6, 7); electric bass (1); bowed bass (3)
Julie Wolf – piano (1, 3, 6, 7); organ (1, 6, 7); accordion (3, 5); rhodes (5, 6); melodica (6); clavinet (6); vocals (5, 6, 7)
Daren Hahn – drums (1, 5, 6, 7); percussion (6); shakers (7)
Hans Teuber – clarinets (5, 6, 7); saxophones, flute, & vocals (6)
Shane Endsley – trumpet (5, 6); shakers (7)
Ravi Best – trumpet & vocals (6)
Mike Dillon – vibes (16, 18); percussion (16)
Allison Miller – drums (17, 18); percussion (17)
Todd Horton – trumpet & flugelhorn (6)
Patrick Warren – chamberlin, piano, sampler (10, 11, 12)
Jay Bellerose – drums and percussion (10, 11, 12)
Andrew Bird – violin, glockenspiel, whistling (11, 12)
Noe Venable – vocals (10, 11, 12)
David Torkanowsky – keyboards & bass (16); percussion (16); wurlitzer (18)
Tony Scherr – electric guitar (10)
Niki Haris – vocals (10)

Production
 New versions recorded by Mike Napolitano at The Dugout in New Orleans, Louisiana
 Mixed by Mike Napolitano and Ani DiFranco
 Mastered by Bruce Barielle
 Original version compilation mastered by Bruce Barielle
 Produced by Ani DiFranco
 Art Direction by Ani DiFranco and Brian Grunert
 Design by Brian Grunert and Tim Staszak
 Album oil paintings by Thomas Kegler
 Color Cover Photo by Danny Clinch
 Black & White Cover Photo and Righteous Ani Photo by Scot Fisher
 Thanks Page Photo by Eric Frick

References 
 Album credits at Righteous Babe website

External links 
 Canon at Righteous Babe Records

2007 compilation albums
Ani DiFranco albums
Righteous Babe compilation albums